Before the unification of Nepal, Khanchi was one of the 24 principalities in the Gandaki River Basin. 
Khanchi, established by Raja Hang Vir Singh in Saka era 1357 (AD 1435), was one of three Meghasi Kingdoms; the others were Argha, founded by Raja Huwambar Singh, and Dhurkot, founded by Raja Jagat Jit Singh. 

The last Raja of Khanchi was Raja Durga Bhajan Shah. 
Khanchi was annexed by Gorkha in AD 1786 (1843 BS).

The territory of Khanchi now forms part of Arghakhanchi District.

References
 
http://arghakhanchi.com ARGHAKAHCNHI TIMES

Chaubisi Rajya
Khanchi
Khanchi
History of Nepal
Khanchi
15th-century establishments in Nepal
18th-century disestablishments in Nepal